Yordanis García Barrisonte (born November 21, 1988 in San Juan y Martínez, Pinar del Río) is a male decathlete from Cuba who competed for his native country at the 2008 Beijing Olympics. The 2005 World Youth champion, he is a two-time medallist at the Pan American Games and has competed at the World Championships in Athletics on three occasions (2007, 2009, 2011). He is the nephew of Yenima Arencibia.

He had his first international success came at the age of sixteen at the 2005 World Youth Championships in Athletics. His winning score in the octathlon, 6482 points, was a new world youth record for the event. García had taken time to develop at the youth level but the Cuban combined events coach, Gabino Arzola, remained convinced that he would mature. Along with Leonel Suárez and Yunior Díaz, García was one of a young Cuban trio that Arzola hoped would gain selection for the 2012 London Olympics. In 2006, García became the Cuban decathlon champion and won a silver medal at the World Junior Championships behind Russian Arkadiy Vasilyev. His runner-up performance was achieved through personal bests in every event but the long jump, which resulted in a Cuban junior record of 7850 points.

García's first senior championship appearances came in 2007, in which he won a silver at the 2007 Pan American Games and took eighth place at the 2007 World Championships in Athletics with a personal best and Cuban record score of 8257 points. He went on to compete at the 2008 Beijing Olympics and just scraped below the 8000-point barrier by eight points, finishing in fifteenth overall. García's compatriot Leonel Suárez, on the other hand, had broken the national record with an 8527-point performance for the Olympic bronze medal. In 2009, García improved his personal best to 8496 points in Havana and went on to finish eighth at the 2009 World Championships in Athletics with 8387 points.

At the start of the outdoor season in 2010, he came third at the Multistars meeting then won at the Erdgas Meeting in Ratingen, Germany – outdoing Suárez with a season's best of 8288. Later that season on the European circuit, he managed fourth place with a total of 8174 points at the Décastar meeting in September – a contest won by his rival Suárez. He began 2011 with a season's best of 8397 points in Havana, but fared less well in Europe, dropping out of the Hypo Meeting and coming sixth with 8067 points at the TNT-Fortuna Meeting. He competed at the 2011 World Championships in Athletics, but dropped out for the second time that season after six events. Suárez topped the podium at the 2011 Pan American Games in October and García joined him with a bronze medal performance.

At the 2012 IAAF World Indoor Championships he came seventh in a small heptathlon field with a tally of 5704 points. He was seventh at the Hypo Meeting in May but improved to third place at the Mehrkampf-Meeting Ratingen a month later.  He competed at the 2012 Summer Olympics, finishing in 14th place with a total of 7956 points.

He competed at the 2015 World Championships, but did not finish.  At the 2016 Olympics, he finished in 18th place with 7961 points.

Personal bests

Outdoor

Indoor

Achievements

References

External links

Tilastopaja biography

1988 births
Living people
Cuban decathletes
People from Pinar del Río
Cuban male athletes
Olympic athletes of Cuba
Athletes (track and field) at the 2008 Summer Olympics
Athletes (track and field) at the 2012 Summer Olympics
Athletes (track and field) at the 2016 Summer Olympics
Pan American Games bronze medalists for Cuba
Pan American Games medalists in athletics (track and field)
Athletes (track and field) at the 2007 Pan American Games
Athletes (track and field) at the 2011 Pan American Games
Athletes (track and field) at the 2015 Pan American Games
World Athletics Championships athletes for Cuba
Central American and Caribbean Games gold medalists for Cuba
Competitors at the 2014 Central American and Caribbean Games
Central American and Caribbean Games medalists in athletics
Medalists at the 2007 Pan American Games
Medalists at the 2011 Pan American Games